Paradigm Concepts, Inc. is a small-press game publishing company located in Fort Lauderdale, Florida. 
They published the award-winning Arcanis campaign setting and managed the Living Arcanis campaign independent of the RPGA.  
Previously Arcanis operated as a d20 system campaign setting using the rules of Dungeons and Dragons.
Arcanis is now featured in Arcanis the Roleplaying Game, being released summer 2011 and the Legends of Arcanis campaign - inheritor of the Living Arcanis history.
They previously published the self-developed Witch Hunter: The Invisible World game-line.  The company was founded by Henry Lopez, Nelson Rodriguez, and Eric Wiener in 2000.

Paradigm Concepts Inc. also produces Spycraft, d20 System, Legend of the Five Rings and True 20 books under license.

The company won the 2005 ENnie award for Fans' Choice Best Publisher.

Paradigm Concepts is known for an active and very successful Origins Game Fair performance and manages the Gathering, the primary Origins Game Fair organized role playing game event.

RPG game settings
 Arcanis RPG 
 Arcanis5e
 Rotted Capes  
 Witch Hunter: The Invisible World

Products
 Races of Legend
 SpellDecks
 Spycraft
 Legend of the Five Rings RPG
 True 20
 Arcanis: the World of Shattered Empires
Arcanis: the Roleplaying Game (Arcanis)
Arcanis 'Cert Shirts'
Witch Hunter: the Invisible World
Witch Hunter: the Invisible World, Second Edition
Strange Aeons of Cthulhu
Rotted Capes

Reception
Paradigm Concepts won the 2005 Gold Ennie Award for "Fan's Choice for Best Publisher".

References

External links
 Paradigm Concepts, Inc. official website
 Origins Game Fair official website

ENnies winners
Role-playing game publishing companies